Statistics of Belgian First Division in the 1953–54 season.

Overview 

It was contested by 16 teams, and R.S.C. Anderlecht won the championship.

League standings

Results

References 

Belgian Pro League seasons
1953–54 in Belgian football
Belgian